Abrothrix andina, also known as the Andean Altiplano mouse or Andean akodont, is a species of rodent in the genus Abrothrix of family Cricetidae. It is found in the Altiplano habitat of the Andes from central Peru through Bolivia, south to Argentina and Chile.

Taxonomy 
Abrothrix andina is a member of the order Rodentia and family Cricetidae with the genus Abrothrix.

Habitat 
Abrothrix andinus is a small mammal that is active throughout the Andes.  The environment consists of small shrubs and is categorizes as having dry summers and snowy winters.

Biology

Diet 
Abrothrix andina primarily eats small shrubs during the summer and shrubs and insects during the winters During extreme temperature changes, the gut morphology changes and energy expenditure changes.
For example, their metabolic rate may increase by 36.6% during the winter. Their body mass has shown to fluctuate throughout the seasons, as well. Their diet has shown behaviors that exhibit hyperphagy.

Behavior 
Abrothrix andina is active throughout the year despite seasonal changes.

References

Literature cited
Musser, G.G. and Carleton, M.D. 2005. Superfamily Muroidea. Pp. 894–1531 in Wilson, D.E. and Reeder, D.M. (eds.). Mammal Species of the World: a taxonomic and geographic reference. 3rd ed. Baltimore: The Johns Hopkins University Press, 2 vols., 2142 pp. 
Pardinas, U. and D'Elia, G. 2008. . In IUCN. IUCN Red List of Threatened Species. Version 2009.2. <www.iucnredlist.org>. Downloaded on January 12, 2010.

Abrothrix
Mammals of the Andes
Mammals of Argentina
Mammals of Bolivia
Mammals of Chile
Mammals of Peru
Mammals described in 1858
Taxonomy articles created by Polbot
Taxobox binomials not recognized by IUCN